Pratylenchus scribneri is a plant pathogenic nematode. It is one of the major plant-parasitic nematodes infecting potatoes.

References

External links 
 Nemaplex, University of California - Pratylenchus scribneri

scribneri
Plant pathogenic nematodes